Lecanoric acid is a chemical produced by several species of lichen. Lecanoric acid is classified as a polyphenol and a didepside and it functions as an antioxidant. The acid is named after  the lichen Lecanora. The acid has also been isolated from Usnea subvacata, Parmotrema stuppuem, Parmotrema tinctorum, Parmotrema grayana, Xanthoparmelia arida and Xanthoparmelia lecanorica. A related compound, 5-chlorolecanoric acid, is found in some species of Punctelia.

References

Polyphenols
Benzoic acids
Benzoate esters
Lichen products